Dame Janet Olive Trotter  (born 29 October 1943) is an academic and administrator in higher education; she helped found the University of Gloucestershire in 2001, becoming its first Vice-Chancellor in the same year. She lives in Cheltenham.

Career

Trotter was born in Kent and attended the Technical High School for Girls at Maidstone before entering Bishop Lonsdale Church of England College (1962-1965) (now part of the University of Derby), where she read Religious Studies.

Trotter taught at King Alfred's College, Winchester (now the University of Winchester) before becoming Vice-Principal of St Martin's College, Lancaster (now part of the University of Cumbria) and Principal of St Paul and St Mary's College, Cheltenham.

In 1989 she chaired HM Government's committee which produced the "Trotter Report" for the Department of Education and Science on the use of information technology in  initial teacher training. In 1990 she was appointed Director of the Cheltenham and Gloucester College of Higher Education, when St Paul and St Mary's College was merged with the higher education sector of the Gloucestershire College of Art and Technology.

Trotter subsequently oversaw its conversion into the University of Gloucestershire in 2001, and was its founding vice-chancellor and principal until her retirement in 2006. As chair of the Council of Church Colleges and Universities she was instrumental in advocating a church presence in higher education. While pursuing a career in higher education, she has also held several positions within the National Health Service in Gloucestershire and the Southwest of England. She is currently chair of the Gloucestershire Hospitals Trust.

On 24 October 2010, Trotter was appointed Lord Lieutenant of Gloucestershire.

Trotter is a Lay Member of Chapter of Gloucester Cathedral

Dame Trotter is currently chair of The Cyber Trust, a charity founded by Professor Richard Benham in 2016 to help vulnerable groups online.

Awards and honours
Trotter was appointed OBE in 1991, promoted to DBE in 2001 and CVO in 2018. She has received honorary doctorates from the University of Pecs, Hungary; Elizabethtown College; Brunel University; Bristol University; the University of the West of England; Newman University College and the University of Gloucestershire.

Publications

References

External links

Official biography, 2004 Report of Gloucestershire County Council (page 20), archived 2 April 2012, accessed September 2021.
Report on inauguration of University of Gloucestershire, BBC
Report on inauguration of University of Gloucestershire, The Times
Official biography, Brunel University
Official biography, University of Chichester
Official biography, Orchestra of the Swan
Honorary Doctorate citation, University of Leicester
Honorary doctorate from the University of Gloucestershire
Gloucestershire Hospitals Board of Directors
Entry in Debretts

1943 births
Living people
People from Kent
People associated with the University of Gloucestershire
Academics of the University of Cumbria
Dames Commander of the Order of the British Empire
Commanders of the Royal Victorian Order
Lord-Lieutenants of Gloucestershire
People from Cheltenham